The 1956 United States Senate election in Illinois was held on November 6, 1956 to elect one of Illinois's members to the United States Senate. Incumbent Republican U.S. Senator Everett Dirksen won reelection to a second term.

Election information
The primaries and general election coincided with those for federal offices (President and House) and state elections.

Primaries were held on April 10.

Turnout
Turnout in the primary elections was 26.26%, with a total of 1,307,357 votes cast.

Turnout during the general election was 81.74%, with 4,264,830 votes cast.

Democratic primary

Republican primary

General election
Dirksen carried 88 of the state's 102 counties. Among the 88 counties that Dirksen won was the state's most populous county, Cook County, in which Dirksen won with 51.13% to Stengel's 48.63%. Despite losing in Cook County, Stengel performed better in the county than he did in the cumulative vote of the remaining 101 counties In the cumulative vote of the state's other 101 counties, Dirksen won 57.32% to Stengel's 42.58%. 51.97% of the votes cast in the election were from Cook County.

While he lost the overall vote in Cook County as a whole, in Cook County's principal city, Chicago (where 37.79% of all votes cast in the election were from), Stengel won 54.33% of the vote to Dirksen's 45.37%

See also 
 1956 United States Senate elections

References 

Illinois
United States Senate
United States Senate elections in Illinois